The 2012–13 Atlanta Hawks season was the 64th season of the franchise in the National Basketball Association (NBA) and 45th in Atlanta.

Key dates
 June 28: The 2012 NBA draft took place at Prudential Center in Newark, New Jersey.

Draft picks

Roster

Pre-season

|- bgcolor=#cfc
| 1
| October 7
| Miami
| 
| Josh Smith (21)
| Damion James (8)
| Jeff Teague (5)
| Philips Arena12,828
| 1–0
|- bgcolor=#fcc
| 2
| October 10
| @ San Antonio
| 
| Damion James, Mike Scott (11)
| Damion James (8)
| Damion James (4)
| AT&T Center14,123
| 1–1
|- bgcolor=#fcc
| 3
| October 14
| @ Memphis
| 
| Al Horford (13)
| Zaza Pachulia (9)
| Jeff Teague (8)
| FedExForum10,072
| 1–2
|- bgcolor=#fcc
| 4
| October 16
| @ Indiana
| 
| Louis Williams (18)
| Damion James (8)
| Jeff Teague (5)
| Bankers Life Fieldhouse10,786
| 1–3
|- bgcolor=#cfc
| 5
| October 18
| New Orleans
| 
| Josh Smith (16)
| Al Horford (11)
| Louis Williams (8)
| Philips Arena8,563
| 2–3
|- bgcolor=#cfc
| 6
| October 20
| Dallas
| 
| Mike Scott (17)
| Josh Smith (13)
| Devin Harris, Louis Williams (6)
| Philips Arena9,935
| 3–3
|- bgcolor=#fcc
| 7
| October 26
| @ Detroit
| 
| Louis Williams (17)
| Al Horford, Damion James (6)
| Devin Harris (5)
| The Palace of Auburn Hills10,825
| 3–4

Regular season

Game log

|- style="background:#fcc;"
| 1 || November 2 || Houston
| 
| Louis Williams (22)
| Josh Smith (10)
| Jeff Teague (7)
| Philips Arena18,238
| 0–1
|- style="background:#cfc;"      
| 2 || November 4 || @ Oklahoma City
| 
| Al Horford (23)
| Al Horford (12)
| Zaza Pachulia (6)
| Chesapeake Energy Arena18,203
| 1-1
|- style="background:#cfc;"       
| 3 || November 7 || Indiana
| 
| Al Horford (16)
| Zaza Pachulia (14)
| Josh Smith (7)
| Philips Arena10,684
| 2-1
|- style="background:#fcc;"       
| 4 || November 9 || Miami
| 
| Jeff Teague (20)
| Josh Smith (8)
| Jeff Teague (11)
| Philips Arena16,785
| 2-2
|- style="background:#fcc;"       
| 5 || November 11 || @ L. A. Clippers
| 
| Josh Smith (13)
| Al Horford (9)
| Jeff Teague (6)
| Staples Center19,060
| 2-3
|- style="background:#cfc;"       
| 6 || November 12 || @ Portland
| 
| Josh Smith (19)
| Josh Smith (11)
| Jeff Teague (8)
| Rose Garden19,095
| 3-3
|- style="background:#fcc;"       
| 7 || November 14 || @ Golden State
| 
| Louis Williams (18)
| Josh Smith (10)
| Louis Williams (6)
| Oracle Arena18,107
| 3-4
|- style="background:#cfc;"       
| 8 || November 16 || @ Sacramento
| 
| Kyle Korver (22)
| Al Horford (10)
| Josh Smith (6)
| Sleep Train Arena11,814
| 4-4
|- style="background:#cfc;"       
| 9 || November 19 || Orlando
| 
| Al Horford (15)
| Zaza Pachulia (11)
| Jeff Teague (7)
| Philips Arena15,066
| 5-4
|- style="background:#cfc;"       
| 10 || November 21 || Washington
| 
| Josh Smith (25)
| Josh Smith (12)
| Al Horford (10)
| Philips Arena11,338
| 6-4
|- style="background:#cfc;"       
| 11 || November 23 || @ Charlotte
| 
| Al Horford (26)
| Al Horford (13)
| Jeff Teague (12)
| Time Warner Cable Arena17,868
| 7-4
|- style="background:#cfc;"       
| 12 || November 24 || L. A. Clippers
| 
| Pachulia & Teague (19)
| Zaza Pachulia (12)
| Jeff Teague (11)
| Philips Arena16,024
| 8-4
|- style="background:#cfc;"      
| 13 || November 28 || Charlotte
| 
| Horford & Smith & Williams (17)
| Josh Smith (13)
| Horford & Smith (6)
| Philips Arena10,162
| 9-4
|- style="background:#fcc;"       
| 14 || November 30 || Cleveland
| 
| Josh Smith (25)
| Al Horford (11)
| Jeff Teague (7)
| Philips Arena13,094
| 9-5

|- style="background:#cfc;"       
| 15 || December 5 || Denver
| 
| Al Horford (25)
| Josh Smith (13)
| Louis Williams (6)
| Philips Arena14,101
| 10-5
|- style="background:#cfc;"       
| 16 || December 7 || Washington
| 
| Josh Smith (23)
| Josh Smith (15)
| Teague & Harris (6)
| Philips Arena13,067
| 11-5
|- style="background:#cfc;"
| 17 || December 8 || @ Memphis
| 
| Josh Smith (24)
| Al Horford (14)
| Jeff Teague (6)
| FedExForum17,612
| 12-5
|- style="background:#fcc;"
| 18 || December 10 || @ Miami
| 
| Josh Smith (22)
| Al Horford (11)
| Josh Smith (6)
| American Airlines Arena19,600
| 12-6
|- style="background:#cfc;"
| 19 || December 12 || @ Orlando
| 
| Smith & Teague (16)
| Al Horford (13)
| Al Horford (4)
| Amway Center16,992
| 13-6
|- style="background:#cfc;"       
| 20 || December 13 || Charlotte
| 
| Devin Harris (20)
| Ivan Johnson (8)
| Louis Williams (9)
| Philips Arena13,090
| 14-6
|- style="background:#fcc;"       
| 21 || December 15 || Golden State
| 
| Al Horford (17)
| Horford & Johnson (9)
| Jeff Teague (8)
| Philips Arena15,145
| 14-7
|- style="background:#cfc;"       
| 22 || December 18 || @ Washington
| 
| Louis Williams (24)
| Josh Smith (13)
| Horford & Teague (6)
| Verizon Center15,123
| 15-7
|- style="background:#fcc;"       
| 23 || December 19 || Oklahoma City
| 
| Jeff Teague (19)
| Josh Smith (12)
| Jeff Teague (9)
| Philips Arena16,284
| 15-8
|- style="background:#fcc;"       
| 24 || December 21 || @ Philadelphia
| 
| Josh Smith (17)
| Horford & Pachulia (8)
| Louis Williams (4)
| Wells Fargo Center18,061
| 15-9
|- style="background:#cfc;"       
| 25 || December 22 || Chicago
| 
| Al Horford (20)
| Al Horford (10)
| Jeff Teague (8)
| Philips Arena17,782
| 16-9
|- style="background:#cfc;"       
| 26 || December 26 || Detroit
| 
| Josh Smith (31)
| Horford & Smith (10)
| Jeff Teague (11)
| Philips Arena15,182
| 17-9
|- style="background:#cfc;"       
| 27 || December 28 || @ Cleveland
| 
| Jeff Teague (27)
| Al Horford (11)
| Jeff Teague (8)
| Quicken Loans Arena19,443
| 18-9
|- style="background:#cfc;"       
| 28 || December 29 || Indiana
| 
| Louis Williams (21)
| Zaza Pachulia (14)
| Louis Williams (12)
| Philips Arena16,558
| 19-9
|- style="background:#fcc;"       
| 29 || December 31 || @ Houston
| 
| Louis Williams (21)
| Al Horford (13)
| Jeff Teague (9)
| Toyota Center18,160
| 19-10

|- style="background:#cfc;"        
| 30 || January 1 || @ New Orleans
| 
| Josh Smith (23)
| Josh Smith (13)
| Jeff Teague (8)
| New Orleans Arena12,712
| 20-10
|- style="background:#fcc;"       
| 31 || January 4 || @ Detroit
| 
| Josh Smith (20)
| Al Horford (15)
| Jeff Teague (9)
| The Palace of Auburn Hills14,832
| 20-11
|- style="background:#fcc;"       
| 32 || January 5 || Boston
| 
| Louis Williams (28)
| Josh Smith (10)
| Josh Smith (5)
| Philips Arena19,159
| 20-12
|- style="background:#fcc;"      
| 33 || January 8 || @ Minnesota
| 
| Williams & Smith (21)
| Josh Smith (13)
| Louis Williams (8)
| Target Center15,988
| 20-13
|- style="background:#fcc;"       
| 34 || January 9 || @ Cleveland
| 
| Josh Smith (17)
| Zaza Pachulia (10)
| Jeff Teague (8)
| Quicken Loans Arena13,149
| 20-14
|- style="background:#cfc;"       
| 35 || January 11 || Utah
| 
| Devin Harris (24)
| Josh Smith (10)
| Josh Smith (6)
| Philips Arena12,064
| 21-14
|- style="background:#fcc;"       
| 36 || January 12 || @ Washington
| 
| Jeff Teague (19)
| Al Horford (12)
| Devin Harris (5)
| Verizon Center15,331
| 21-15
|- style="background:#fcc;"       
| 37 || January 14 || @ Chicago
| 
| Mike Scott (10)
| Al Horford (11)
| Jeff Teague (5)
| United Center21,430
| 21-16
|- style="background:#cfc;"
| 38 || January 16 || Brooklyn
| 
| Jeff Teague (28)
| Al Horford (13)
| Jeff Teague (11)
| Philips Arena15,029
| 22-16
|- style="background:#fcc;"
| 39 || January 18 || @ Brooklyn
| 
| Jeff Teague (21)
| Josh Smith (9)
| Jeff Teague (10)
| Barclays Center17,732
| 22-17
|- style="background:#fcc;"
| 40 || January 19 || San Antonio
| 
| Josh Smith (21)
| Al Horford (15)
| Jeff Teague (8)
| Philips Arena18,255
| 22-18
|- style="background:#cfc;"
| 41 || January 21 || Minnesota
| 
| Al Horford (28)
| Al Horford (10)
| Jeff Teague (10)
| Philips Arena13,808
| 23-18
|- style="background:#cfc;"
| 42 || January 23 || @ Charlotte
| 
| Josh Smith (30)
| Ivan Johnson (15)
| Josh Smith (8)
| Time Warner Cable Arena12,534
| 24-18
|- style="background:#cfc;"       
| 43 || January 25 || Boston
| 
| Kyle Korver (27)
| Josh Smith (14)
| Teague & Smith (7)
| Philips Arena15,595
| 25-18
|- style="background:#fcc;"       
| 44 || January 27 || @ New York
| 
| Jeff Teague (27)
| Kyle Korver (7)
| Jeff Teague (6)
| Madison Square Garden19,033
| 25-19
|- style="background:#cfc;"       
| 45 || January 30 || Toronto
| 
| Al Horford (22)
| Josh Smith (11)
| Jeff Teague (7)
| Philips Arena12,021
| 26-19

|- style="background:#fcc;"        
| 46 || February 2 || Chicago
| 
| Josh Smith (19)
| Josh Smith (13)
| Josh Smith (5)
| Philips Arena17,898
| 26-20
|- style="background:#fcc;"       
| 47 || February 5 || @ Indiana
| 
| Jeff Teague (24)
| Josh Smith (10)
| Teague & Korver (8)
| Bankers Life Fieldhouse12,578
| 26-21
|- style="background:#cfc;"       
| 48 || February 6 || Memphis
| 
| Jeff Teague (22)
| Horford & Smith (11)
| Jeff Teague (13)
| Philips Arena13,198
| 27-21
|- style="background:#fcc;"       
| 49 || February 8 || New Orleans
| 
| Josh Smith (23)
| Horford & Smith (6)
| Jeff Teague (9)
| Philips Arena14,022
| 27-22
|- style="background:#cfc;"
| 50 || February 11 || @ Dallas
| 
| Josh Smith (26)
| Josh Smith (13)
| Jeff Teague (9)
| American Airlines Center19,654
| 28-22
|- style="background:#cfc;"
| 51 || February 13 || @ Orlando
| 
| Josh Smith (30)
| Al Horford (12)
| Jeff Teague (11)
| Amway Center17,649
| 29-22
|- align="center"
|colspan="9" bgcolor="#bbcaff"|All-Star Break
|- style="background:#fcc;"       
| 52 || February 20 || Miami
| 
| Al Horford (27)
| Horford & Smith (9)
| Josh Smith (9)
| Philips Arena18,238
| 29-23
|- style="background:#cfc;"      
| 53 || February 22 || Sacramento
| 
| Al Horford (24)
| Al Horford (8)
| Jeff Teague (12)
| Philips Arena15,031
| 30-23
|- style="background:#cfc;"       
| 54 || February 23 || @ Milwaukee
| 
| Al Horford (23)
| Josh Smith (13)
| Jeff Teague (9)
| BMO Harris Bradley Center18,289
| 31-23
|- style="background:#cfc;"       
| 55 || February 25 || @ Detroit
| 
| Horford & Smith (23)
| Al Horford (22)
| Jeff Teague (12)
| The Palace of Auburn Hills12,417
|32-23
|- style="background:#cfc;"      
| 56 || February 27 || @ Utah
| 
| Al Horford (34)
| Al Horford (15)
| Josh Smith (7)
| EnergySolutions Arena19,267
| 33-23

|- style="background:#fcc;"        
| 57 || March 1 || @ Phoenix
| 
| Al Horford (20)
| Josh Smith (10)
| Devin Harris (6)
| US Airways Center15,269
| 33-24
|- style="background:#fcc;"      
| 58 || March 3 || @ L. A. Lakers
| 
| Al Horford (24)
| Josh Smith (7)
| Josh Smith (7)
| Staples Center18,997
| 33-25
|- style="background:#fcc;"       
| 59 || March 4 || @ Denver
| 
| Al Horford (18)
| Al Horford (13)
| Jeff Teague (8)
| Pepsi Center17,554
| 33-26
|- style="background:#cfc;"       
| 60 || March 6 || Philadelphia
| 
| Jeff Teague (27)
| Al Horford (12)
| Jeff Teague (11)
| Philips Arena13,018
| 34-26
|- style="background:#fcc;"      
| 61 || March 8 || @ Boston
| 
| Josh Smith (32)
| Al Horford (13)
| Smith & Teague (9)
| TD Garden18,624
| 34-27
|- style="background:#fcc;"      
| 62 || March 9 || Brooklyn
| 
| Al Horford (15)
| Al Horford (12)
| Devin Harris (9)
| Philips Arena17,282
| 34-28
|- style="background:#fcc;"      
| 63 || March 12 || @ Miami
| 
| Josh Smith (15)
| Josh Smith (6)
| Jeff Teague (4)
| American Airlines Arena20,350
| 34-29
|- style="background:#cfc;"       
| 64 || March 13 || L. A. Lakers
| 
| Devin Harris (17)
| Al Horford (14)
| Devin Harris (7)
| Philips Arena19,163
| 35-29
|- style="background:#cfc;"       
| 65 || March 15 || Phoenix
| 
| Josh Smith (17)
| Horford & Smith (11)
|  Josh Smith (7)
| Philips Arena14,282
| 36-29
|- style="background:#cfc;"      
| 66 || March 17 || @ Brooklyn
| 
| Al Horford (22)
| Al Horford (11)
| Jeff Teague (15)
| Barclays Center17,732
| 37-29
|- style="background:#fcc;"      
| 67 || March 18 || Dallas
| 
| Jeff Teague (19)
| Al Horford (11)
| Jeff Teague (7)
| Philips Arena14,505
| 37-30
|- style="background:#cfc;"       
| 68 || March 20 || Milwaukee
| 
| Jeff Teague (27)
| Al Horford (16)
| Jeff Teague (11)
| Philips Arena11,920
| 38-30
|- style="background:#fcc;"       
| 69 || March 22 || Portland
| 
| Josh Smith (24)
| Al Horford (17)
| Jeff Teague (7)
| Philips Arena16,348
| 38-31
|- style="background:#cfc;"       
| 70 || March 24 || @ Milwaukee
|  
| Al Horford (24)
| Josh Smith (9)
| Jeff Teague (8)
| BMO Harris Bradley Center17,587
| 39-31
|- style="background:#fcc;"       
| 71 || March 25 || @ Indiana
| 
| Josh Smith (20)
| Al Horford (8)
| Josh Smith (4)
| Bankers Life Fieldhouse14,336
| 39-32
|- style="background:#cfc;"       
| 72 || March 27 || @ Toronto
|  
| Al Horford (26)
| Al Horford (12)
| Jeff Teague (13)
| Air Canada Centre18,206
| 40-32
|- style="background:#fcc;"      
| 73 || March 29 || @ Boston
| 
| Mike Scott (19)
| Johan Petro (7)
| Shelvin Mack (9)
| TD Garden18,624
| 40-33
|- style="background:#cfc;"      
| 74 || March 30 || Orlando
| 
| Josh Smith (21)
| Devin Harris (10)
| Devin Harris (6)
| Philips Arena17,152
| 41-33

|- style="background:#cfc;"       
| 75 || April 1 || Cleveland
|  
| Devin Harris (25)
| Josh Smith (14)
| Jeff Teague (9)
| Philips Arena13,026
| 42-33
|- style="background:#fcc;"       
| 76 || April 3 || New York
| 
| Kyle Korver (25)
| Josh Smith (8)
| Jeff Teague (9)
| Philips Arena17,404
| 42-34
|- style="background:#fcc;"       
| 77 || April 5 || Philadelphia
| 
| Josh Smith (19)
| Al Horford (10)
| Jeff Teague (9)
| Philips Arena17,020
| 42-35
|- style="background:#fcc;"      
| 78 || April 6 || @ San Antonio
| 
| John Jenkins (23)
| Johan Petro (15)
| Shelvin Mack (8)
| AT&T Center18,581
| 42-36
|- style="background:#cfc;"       
| 79 || April 10 || @ Philadelphia
|  
| Josh Smith (28)
| Josh Smith (12)
| Jeff Teague (11)
| Wells Fargo Center17,178
| 43-36
|- style="background:#cfc;"       
| 80 || April 12 || Milwaukee
| 
| Josh Smith (24)
| Al Horford (17)
| Jeff Teague (10)
| Philips Arena16,908
| 44-36
|- style="background:#fcc;"      
| 81 || April 16 || Toronto
| 
| Kyle Korver (13)
| Mike Scott (12)
| Jeff Teague (9)
| Philips Arena15,200
| 44-37
|- style="background:#fcc;"      
| 82 || April 17 || @ New York
| 
| Mike Scott (23)
| Mike Scott (14)
| Shelvin Mack (4)
| Madison Square Garden19,033
| 44-38

Standings

Playoffs

|- style="background:#fcc;"
| 1
| April 21
| @ Indiana
| 
| Jeff Teague (21)
| Josh Smith (8)
| Jeff Teague (7)
| Bankers Life Fieldhouse18,165
| 0-1
|- style="background:#fcc;"
| 2
| April 24
| @ Indiana
| 
| Devin Harris (17)
| Al Horford (10)
| Jeff Teague (5), Devin Harris (5)
| Bankers Life Fieldhouse18,165
| 0-2
|- style="background:#cfc;"
| 3
| April 27
| Indiana
| 
| Al Horford (26)
| Al Horford (16)
| Josh Smith (6)
| Philips Arena18,238
| 1-2
|- style="background:#cfc;"
| 4
| April 29
| Indiana
| 
| Josh Smith (29)
| Josh Smith (11)
| Jeff Teague (6), Devin Harris (6)
| Philips Arena18,241
| 2-2
|- style="background:#fcc;"
| 5
| May 1
| @ Indiana
| 
| Smith & Horford (14)
| Al Horford (9)
| Jeff Teague (5)
| Bankers Life Fieldhouse18,165
| 2-3
|- style="background:#fcc;"
| 6
| May 3
| Indiana
| 
| Al Horford (15)
| Josh Smith (9)
| Smith, Horford, & Harris (3)
| Philips Arena18,238
| 2-4

Player statistics

|- align="center" bgcolor=""
|  || 58 || 34 || 24.5 || .438 || .335 || .730 || 2.0 || 3.4 || 1.10 || .22 || 9.9
|- align="center" bgcolor="#f0f0f0"
|  || 74 || 74 || 37.2 || .543 || .500 || .640 || 10.2 || 3.2 || 1.05 || 1.05 || 17.4
|- align="center" bgcolor=""
| || 61 || 2 || 14.8 || .446 || .384 || .840 || 1.5 || 0.9 || .20 || .16 || 6.1
|- align="center" bgcolor="#f0f0f0"
| || 74 || 60 || 30.5 || .461 || .457 || .860 || 4.0 || 2.0 || .95 || .50 || 10.9
|- align="center" bgcolor=""
|  || 20 || 1 || 13.4 || 0 || 0 || 0 || 0 || 0 || 0 || 0 || 5.2
|- align="center" bgcolor="#f0f0f0"
|  || 24 || 1 || 12.5 || .423 || .395 || .890 || 1.1 || 0.4 || .50 || .04 || 5.2
|- align="center" bgcolor=""
| || 52 || 15 || 21.8 || .473 || .000 || .760 || 6.5 || 1.5 || .67 || .23 || 5.9
|- align="center" bgcolor="#f0f0f0"
|  || 31 || 8 || 11.4 || .436 || .250 || .920 || 3.6 || 0.5 || .32 || .29 || 3.5
|- align="center" bgcolor=""
|   || 40 || 1 || 9.4 || .476 || .000 || .770 || 2.8 || 0.3 || .10 || .05 || 4.6
|- align="center" bgcolor="#f0f0f0"
| || 76 || 76 || 35.3 || .465 || .303 || .520 || 8.4 || 4.2 || 1.24 || 1.79 || 17.5
|- align="center" bgcolor=""
|  || 56 || 31 || 20.7 || .374 || .364 || .520 || 2.2 || 0.9 || .52 || .11 || 5.1
|- align="center" bgcolor="#f0f0f0"
| || 24 || 1 || 15.5 || 0 || 0 || 0 || 0 || 0 || 0 || 0 || 4.1
|- align="center" bgcolor=""
|  || 80 || 78 || 32.9 || 0 || 0 || 0 || 0 || 0 || 0 || 0 || 14.6
|- align="center" bgcolor=""
| || 39 || 9 || 28.7 || 0 || 0 || 0 || 0 || 0 || 0 || 0 || 14.1
|- align="center" bgcolor="""#f0f0f0"
|| || 7 || 0 || 16.1 || 0 || 0 || 0 || 0 || 0 || 0 || 0 || 5.0
|- align="center" bgcolor=""
|| || 28 || 4 || 13.6 || 0 || 0 || 0 || 0 || 0 || 0 || 0 || 3.1
|- align="center" bgcolor="""#f0f0f0"
|}

Transactions

  Cut from the roster during training camp.

Trades

Free Agency

See also
2012–13 NBA season

References

Atlanta Hawks seasons
Atlanta Hawks
Atlanta Haw
Atlanta Haw